Teracotona euprepia is a moth in the family Erebidae. It was described by George Hampson in 1900. It is found in Angola, the Democratic Republic of the Congo, Malawi, South Africa, Tanzania, Uganda and Zimbabwe.

Subspecies
Teracotona euprepia euprepia
Teracotona euprepia bicolor Toulgoët, 1980 (Malawi, Tanzania)

References

Moths described in 1900
Spilosomina